Isis / Pig Destroyer is a split EP by the bands Pig Destroyer and Isis, released in 2000. The EP, which features the two bands playing cover songs, was released on 7" vinyl. 

Isis' interpretation of "Streetcleaner" was previously released on their Sawblade EP. Pig Destroyer's interpretations of "Exhume to Consume", "Genital Grinder", and "Regurgitation of Giblets" were later included on their 38 Counts of Battery compilation.

Track listing
Isis – "Streetcleaner" (Godflesh cover; originally from Streetcleaner)
Pig Destroyer – "Exhume to Consume" (Carcass cover; originally from Symphonies of Sickness)
Pig Destroyer – "Genital Grinder / Regurgitation of Giblets" (Carcass covers; originally from Reek of Putrefaction)

References

Pig Destroyer albums
Isis (band) albums
Split EPs
2000 EPs